Liaoyang can refer to:

Liaoyang city
Liaoyang County
Liaoyang province during the Yuan dynasty
Liaoyang Railway Station
Liaoyang TV